Comunn na Gàidhlig, abbreviated to "CnaG", is an organisation which seeks to promote Scottish Gaelic language and culture.

History
Comunn na Gàidhlig was founded in 1984 by the Scottish Office to co-ordinate new developments in Gaelic language policy.  It has charitable status. It has offices in Stornoway, Inverness, Glasgow, and additional staff based in Uist, Skye, Islay, Edinburgh and Lochaber. Its chairperson is Kenneth MacIver.

Comunn na Gàidhlig should not be confused with An Comunn Gàidhealach, which has a broader cultural remit, or Bòrd na Gàidhlig, a quango.

External links
 

1984 establishments in Scotland
Charities based in Scotland
Scottish Gaelic language
Gai